King Shenjing of Zhou, personal name Jī Dìng, was the thirty-sixth king of the Chinese Zhou dynasty and the twenty-fourth of the Eastern Zhou.

He was a son of his predecessor, King Xian of Zhou and thus nephew of King Lie; his paternal grandfather was King An of Zhou. He reigned from 320 BC until his death in 315 BC.

Shenjing fathered his successor, King Nan of Zhou, who went on to have a very long reign.

Family
Sons:
 Prince Yan (d. 256 BC), ruled as King Nan of Zhou from 314–256 BC

Ancestry

See also
Family tree of ancient Chinese emperors

References 

315 BC deaths
Zhou dynasty kings
4th-century BC Chinese monarchs
Year of birth unknown